Wang Guosheng may refer to:

Wang Guosheng (general): general of the People's Liberation Army
Wang Guosheng (politician): governor of Hubei province